Maksim Inić (born 26 May 1996) is a Montenegrin swimmer. He competed in the men's 50 metre freestyle event at the 2016 Summer Olympics.

References

External links
 

1996 births
Living people
Montenegrin male freestyle swimmers
Olympic swimmers of Montenegro
Swimmers at the 2016 Summer Olympics
Place of birth missing (living people)